JMY Records (Jazz Music Yesterday) was an Italian record label that produced a number of albums of major jazz players in the 1990s, based on mainly live recordings from the 1960s and 1970s.

Artists
 Dave Brubeck
 Sarah Vaughan
 Miles Davis
 Quincy Jones
 Bobby Hutcherson and Harold Land
 Dollar Brand
 Archie Shepp
 Art Ensemble of Chicago
 Ray Charles
 Duke Ellington
 Phil Woods

External links
 JMY Records listing at  Jazz Discography

Italian record labels
Jazz record labels
Defunct record labels of Italy